Calcutt is a village in the Harrogate district of North Yorkshire, England.

External links

Villages in North Yorkshire